Rhyparochromus is a genus of dirt-colored seed bugs in the family Rhyparochromidae. There are more than 40 described species in Rhyparochromus.

Species
These 41 species belong to the genus Rhyparochromus:

 Rhyparochromus adspersus (Mulsant & Rey, 1852)
 Rhyparochromus albomaculatus (Scott, 1874)
 Rhyparochromus arabicus Linnavuori, 1978
 Rhyparochromus armenicus Seidenstucker, 1963
 Rhyparochromus brevis (Lethierry, 1883)
 Rhyparochromus carbonarius (Rambur, 1839)
 Rhyparochromus celeripes (Kiritshenko, 1914)
 Rhyparochromus creticus Josifov, 1963
 Rhyparochromus csikii (Horvath, 1901)
 Rhyparochromus dimidiatus Curtis, 1836
 Rhyparochromus douglasi (Fieber, 1864)
 Rhyparochromus geniculatus (Signoret, 1860)
 Rhyparochromus ibericus Baerensprung, 1858
 Rhyparochromus japonicus (Stal, 1874)
 Rhyparochromus kangricus (Kirkaldy, 1907)
 Rhyparochromus leucodermus Fieber, 1861
 Rhyparochromus melanopus Kiritshenko & Scudder, 1973
 Rhyparochromus minusculus (Reuter, 1885)
 Rhyparochromus nigellatus (Lindberg, 1932)
 Rhyparochromus nigritus Seidenstucker, 1963
 Rhyparochromus nigroruber Stal, 1858
 Rhyparochromus nuristanicus (Kiritshenko, 1938)
 Rhyparochromus omissus (Horvath, 1911)
 Rhyparochromus pallidicornis (Reuter, 1891)
 Rhyparochromus persicellus (Kirkaldy, 1909)
 Rhyparochromus phoeniceus (Rossi, 1794)
 Rhyparochromus pini Linnaeus, 1758
 Rhyparochromus quadratus (Fabricius, 1798)
 Rhyparochromus raptorius Signoret, 1860
 Rhyparochromus sabulicola Linnavuori, 1989
 Rhyparochromus saturnius Rossi, 1790
 Rhyparochromus seidenstuckeri Slater, 1964
 Rhyparochromus semidolens Walker, 1870
 Rhyparochromus sogdianus (Kiritshenko, 1914)
 Rhyparochromus taleus Lucas *, 1846
 Rhyparochromus turanicus (Wagner, 1961)
 Rhyparochromus vallonius (Lindberg, 1935)
 Rhyparochromus vittiger Kiritshenko & Scudder, 1973
 Rhyparochromus vallonius (Lindberg, 1935)
 (Rhyparochromus vulgaris (Lindberg, 1935)) - Raglius vulgaris
 Rhyparochromus walkeri (Saunders, 1876)
 † Rhyparochromus terreus Scudder *, 1878
 † Rhyparochromus verrilli Scudder, 1890

References

Further reading

External links

 

Rhyparochromidae
Articles created by Qbugbot